The 2013 FIM Speedway World Cup (SWC) was the thirteenth FIM Speedway World Cup, the annual international speedway world championship tournament. It took place between 13 July and 20 July 2013 and involved eight national teams. Six teams were seeded through to the tournament and two qualification rounds were held in April and May 2011 to determine the final two places.

Qualification
The top six nations from the 2012 Speedway World Cup (Poland, Denmark, Sweden, Great Britain, Australia and Russia) were granted automatic qualification, with the remaining two places divided among two qualifying rounds. Qualifying Round One was hosted in Daugavpils, Latvia and Qualifying Round Two was hosted in Miskolc, Hungary.

 Qualifying Round One
  Daugavpils
 1 May 2013

 Qualifying Round Two
  Miskolc
 20 May 2013

Qualified teams

Tournament

Semi-finals

Race off

World Cup final

Results

Scorers  
  41 - Jarosław Hampel (15), Maciej Janowski (12) Krzysztof Kasprzak (7), Patryk Dudek (7)
  40 - Niels Kristian Iversen (12), Kenneth Bjerre (11), Nicki Pedersen (10), Michael Jepsen Jensen (7)
  33 - Darcy Ward (9), Troy Batchelor (11), Cameron Woodward (8), Jason Doyle (5)
  12 - Aleš Dryml Jr. (7), Václav Milík Jr. (3), Lukáš Dryml (1), Josef Franc (1)

Final classification

See also
 2013 Speedway Grand Prix

References

External links
 SpeedwayWorld.tv (SWC news)

 
World Team
2013